Philippe Cammaerts (born 14 May 1894, date of death unknown) was a Belgian sports shooter. He competed in three events at the 1920 Summer Olympics.

References

External links
 

1894 births
Year of death missing
Belgian male sport shooters
Olympic shooters of Belgium
Shooters at the 1920 Summer Olympics
Place of birth missing